Active rock is a radio format used by many commercial radio stations across the United States and Canada. Active rock stations play a balance of new hard rock songs with valued classic rock favorites, normally with an emphasis on the harder edge of mainstream rock and album-oriented rock.

Format background
There is no concrete definition of the active rock format. Sean Ross, editor of Airplay Monitor, described active rock in the late 1990s as album-oriented rock (AOR) "with a greater emphasis on the harder end of the spectrum". Radio & Records defined the format as based on current rock hits in frequent rotation and targeted to males ages 18–34, akin to the approach of contemporary hit radio (CHR) stations.

An active rock station may include songs by classic hard rock artists whereas a modern rock or alternative station would not; such acts include AC/DC, Def Leppard, Guns N' Roses, Led Zeppelin, Jimi Hendrix, and Van Halen. Additionally, an active rock station will play a very popular demand in rotation of new hard rock and heavy metal artists as well as hard rock and heavy metal artists from the mid-1990s and throughout the 2000s. Usually an active rock station will play predominantly newer artists and songs, while other stations will play a balance of classic and new hard rock as close to home as possible to mainstream rock without overlapping the format. Particularly artists that are often absent from alternative rock and classic rock radio playlists tend to be the main focus of the format, such as Three Days Grace, Shinedown, Slipknot, Breaking Benjamin, Korn, Avenged Sevenfold, Five Finger Death Punch, System of a Down, Disturbed, Papa Roach, Tool, Metallica, and Linkin Park. New and emerging artists have been given better exposure with this format being used, with artists like The Veer Union, Seasons After, Like a Storm, Burn Halo, Candlelight Red, and Messer. Some artists which are heard on modern rock stations also receive heavy active rock airplay, such as Foo Fighters, Red Hot Chili Peppers, The Offspring, Green Day, Bush, and Queens of the Stone Age, albeit less frequently in rotation than newer acts like Imagine Dragons, Twenty One Pilots, Silversun Pickups, Nothing but Thieves, Rise Against, and Biffy Clyro. Alternative metal bands also enjoy airplay on active rock stations; examples of such acts include Red, Mudvayne, Nonpoint, Drowning Pool, Nothing More, Gemini Syndrome, Periphery, Fire from the Gods, Egypt Central,  Stitched Up Heart, Islander, Fair to Midland, Crossfade, and CKY.

Stations
A pioneering station of the active rock format in the late 1980s was WIYY (98 Rock) in Baltimore. Early adopters of the format in the United States by the beginning of the 1990s also include WIIL (95 WIIL Rock) in Kenosha, Wisconsin, KISW (99.9 The Rock KISW) in Seattle, Washington, WRIF in Detroit, Michigan, KISS-FM (99.5 KISS Rocks) in San Antonio, KQRC-FM (98.9 The Rock!) in Kansas City, Missouri, WLZX-FM (Lazer 99.3) in Northampton, Massachusetts, WXTB (98 Rock) in Tampa, Florida, KBPI in Denver, Colorado,  KOMP in Las Vegas, Nevada, WHQG (102.9 The Hog and previously known as WLZR Lazer 103) in Milwaukee, Wisconsin, KILO (94.3 KILO) in Colorado Springs, Colorado, KEGL (97.1 The Eagle) in Dallas/Fort Worth, Texas, WJJO (Solid Rock 94.1 JJO) in Madison, Wisconsin, and KUPD (97.9 KUPD) in Tempe-Phoenix, Arizona. WIIL was not an early adopter.  The station started out as album rock in 1992.  In the 2000s, WIIL was a mixture of classic rock and active rock.  It evolved to only active rock in the 2000 teens.  

Younger and successful active rockers include KHTQ (Rock 94) in Spokane, Washington, WNOR (FM99) in Norfolk, Virginia, KQXR (100.3 The X) in Boise, Idaho, WZOR/WZOS (Razor 94.7 & 104.7) in Green Bay-Oshkosh-Fond du Lac, Wisconsin, KAZR (Lazer 103.3) in Des Moines, Iowa, KRZN (96.3 The Zone) in Billings, Montana, and KDOT (Rock 104.5) in Reno, Nevada.

In Canada, active rock stations include CFPL-FM in London, Ontario, CJAY-FM in Calgary, CFBR-FM in Edmonton, CFGP-FM in Grande Prairie, Alberta, CHTZ-FM in St. Catharines, Ontario, and CJKR-FM in Winnipeg.

Satellite radio channels in the US and Canada with the active rock format include Sirius XM Radio's Octane and the gold-based Ozzy's Boneyard. Former counterparts prior to the November 12, 2008, Sirius/XM channel merger were XM's squiZZ and Sirius's BuzzSaw.

Australian radio network Triple M also broadcasts an active rock format.

References

External links
Current Active Rock chart as reported by Mediabase

Rock radio formats